WZTR (104.3 FM) is a radio station broadcasting a hybrid country music/classic rock format, licensed to Dahlonega, Georgia, United States. The station is currently owned by Grady W. Turner and features programming from ABC Radio.

Turner purchased the radio station in 2006, then operating as WKHC-FM ("Gold 104.3") carrying ABC's satellite "Real Country" format. In 2008 the station changed its moniker to "Thunder 104.3 FM", and changed its format from classic country to a mix of classic rock, southern rock and country music. The station returned its status to locally owned and operated, providing coverage of high school sports, NASCAR racing, along with a wide variety of community coverage and events. Recently the station added Jimmy's Morning Show featuring Radio Manager and DJ Jimmy McBride, and the Afternoon Drive Time Show with Jonathan Carr.

References

External links

ZTR